20 Vulpeculae is single star located around 1,170 light years away in the northern constellation of Vulpecula. It is visible to the naked eye as a dim, blue-white hued star with an apparent visual magnitude of 5.91. The object is moving closer to the Earth with a heliocentric radial velocity of −22 km/s.

This is a Be star with a stellar classification of B7 Ve. It is spinning rapidly with a projected rotational velocity of 236 km/s (compared to a critical velocity of 332 km/s) and has an estimated polar inclination of 71.1°. The star has four times the mass of the Sun and is radiating around 460 times the Sun's luminosity from its photosphere at an effective temperature of 12,050 K.

References

External links
 

B-type main-sequence stars
Be stars
Vulpecula
Durchmusterung objects
Vulpeculae, 20
192044
099531
7719